Damon Buxton is an American fingerstyle acoustic guitarist and composer. His primary instrument is the six-string classical guitar. He uses silent spaces, open tunings, natural reverb, and double picking. His compositions draw on musical traditions of fingerstyle, classical, new age, and jazz. Buxton is a self-taught musician who began playing the guitar at age 21 and developed his trademark fingerpicking style. He currently lives in the Pittsburgh Pennsylvania area with his wife and two cats.

Early life and education 
Buxton was born in 1958 in La Mesa California. His father was a businessman who negotiated the manufacture of aircraft components in Naples, Italy, and played the Hammond organ and accordion. His mother was a homemaker and church singer. The two provided a musical foundation and example of music as underpinning to a satisfying life. A 1969 family trip to Italy cemented an interest in the classical arts with a global perspective. Buxton attended Cornish College of the Arts in Seattle, graduating with a Bachelor of Fine Arts degree. In 2004, his work for the Fred Hutchinson Cancer Research Center was recognized with a Sappi Ideas That Matter award.

Career

Composing & Performing Style 
Buxton employs a tempo and volume dynamic in his compositions preferring to let the sound of notes and chords ring out in a contemplative space to achieve a greater dynamic range. Zone Music Reporter reviewer Bill Binkelman places Buxton at the top tier of guitarists, calling him "A rare, unique visionary on the acoustic guitar." Damon Buxton is a Hannabach strings artist and has used their strings exclusively since 2006.

Forgiving Dreams and collaboration with William Ackerman 
After initial success with a demo release, "Sketchbook One," Buxton established a recording collaboration with William Ackerman, Grammy award-winning founder of Windham Hill Records, who produced his 2007 release, "Forgiving Dreams." Of this recording, RJ Lannan of Zone Music Reporter wrote, "Like a writer who speaks volumes with a few words, Buxton's sparse style shouts to the rooftops that the musical voice you hear is one to be reckoned with." Lannon later compared Buxton's talents to his mentor's, saying, "His talent is equal to Ackerman's on many levels."

Recordings with Corin Nelsen 
In 2010, Buxton began a separate collaboration with Corin Nelsen, house engineer and builder of the studio at Ackerman's Imaginary Road Studios. Nelsen designed an individual space to let Buxton record instruments with microphones placed close to the artist to deliver an experience much like the performer sitting in the room next to the listener as possible. Nelson continues to mix and master Buxton's releases.

This collaboration produced six additional recordings that leverage this technique.

Many Miles Music 
Buxton founded the record label Many Miles Music to distribute his own releases and produce compilation works of similar artists in the New Age genre. Three compilation recordings sprang from this effort - Winter Gifts, Winter Gifts II, and Roads.

Other Collaborations 
Buxton's piece "Unbroken" appears on the 2013 compilation The Best of Reviews New Age: The Guitar alongside works by guitarists Alex de Grassi and William Ackerman.

Buxton's 2011 "Unbroken" and "Book of Ruth" feature accompaniment by Paul Winter Consort cellist Eugene Friesen.

Notable Concerts 
Kirkland Performance Center with Heidi Ann Breyer - 2013

Bastyr University Chapel - 2015 

Bastyr University Chapel - 2017

Discography 
 Sketchbook One - 2006 
 Forgiving Dreams - 2007
 Rotation of Earth - 2010
 Winter Gifts: The Many Miles Music Artists - 2010
 Unbroken - 2012 
 Winter Gifts II: The Many Miles Music Artists - 2012 
 Visitations - 2013 
 The Best of Reviews New Age: The Guitar - 2013 
 Roads: The Many Miles Music Artists - 2014 
 A Trick of Light - 2015
 Another Sunday Drive - 2017
 A Winter's Night - 2018
 The Golden Age - 2019
 Someday - 2020
 Love In The Time Of War - 2021
 Because I Love You - 2022

References

External links 
 Official website
 Facebook page for Damon Buxton
 All Music Database page for Damon Buxton

21st-century American composers
Guitarists from California
Year of birth missing (living people)
American male guitarists
Living people
American male composers
21st-century American male musicians